The number of women sitting in the House of Commons increased to five during the 24th Canadian Parliament; the number of women senators increased to seven. 21 women ran for seats in the Canadian House of Commons in the 1958 federal election; the two women incumbents were reelected. Three more women were elected in by-elections held following the general election: Jean Casselman Wadds in September 1958, Judy LaMarsh in October 1960, and Margaret Mary Macdonald in May 1961.

Two additional women: Olive Lillian Irvine and Josie Alice Quart were named to the Canadian senate in January 1960. Cairine Wilson died in March 1962, which brought the number of women senators to six.

Party Standings

Members of the House of Commons

Senators

References 

Lists of women politicians in Canada